The arrector pili muscles, also known as hair erector muscles, are small muscles attached to hair follicles in mammals. Contraction of these muscles causes the hairs to stand on end, known colloquially as goose bumps (piloerection).

Structure 
Each arrector pili is composed of a bundle of smooth muscle fibres which attach to several follicles (a follicular unit). Each is innervated by the sympathetic division of the autonomic nervous system. The muscle attaches to the follicular stem cell niche in the follicular bulge, splitting at their deep end to encircle the follicle.

Function 
The contraction of the muscle is involuntary. Stresses such as cold, fear etc. may stimulate the sympathetic nervous system, and thus cause muscle contraction.

Thermal insulation 
Contraction of arrector pili muscles have a principal function in the majority of mammals of providing thermal insulation. Air becomes trapped between the erect hairs, helping the animal retain heat.

Self defence 
Erection of the porcupine's long, thick hairs causes the animal to become more intimidating, scaring predators.

Sebum excretion 
Pressure exerted by the muscle may cause sebum to be forced along the hair follicle towards the surface, protecting the hair.

Hair follicle stability 
Arrector pili muscles also stabilise the base of the hair follicle.

Clinical significance 
Skin conditions such as leprosy can damage arrector pili muscles, preventing their contraction.

History 
The term "arrector pili" comes from Latin. It translates to "hair erector".

Additional images

Notes

References
Myers, P., R. Espinosa, C. S. Parr, T. Jones, G. S. Hammond, and T. A. Dewey. 2006. The Animal Diversity Web; https://web.archive.org/web/20110903154915/http://animaldiversity.ummz.umich.edu/site/topics/mammal_anatomy/hair.html

Hair anatomy